The Stearns County Courthouse is the seat of government for Stearns County in St. Cloud, Minnesota, United States.  The Beaux-Arts style building was constructed in 1921 to replace Stearns County's original 1864 courthouse.  It stands in a prominent square in downtown St. Cloud, flanked by other government buildings.  A Prairie School style jail was built to the northeast in 1922, and the two buildings were listed as the Stearns County Courthouse and Jail on the National Register of Historic Places in 1982 for having local significance in the themes of architecture and politics/government.  They were nominated for being prominent symbols of Stearns County government.  The 1922 jail building was demolished in 1987.

See also
 List of county courthouses in Minnesota
 National Register of Historic Places listings in Stearns County, Minnesota

References

External links

 Stearns County District Court

1921 establishments in Minnesota
Beaux-Arts architecture in Minnesota
Buildings and structures in St. Cloud, Minnesota
County courthouses in Minnesota
Courthouses on the National Register of Historic Places in Minnesota
Government buildings completed in 1921
National Register of Historic Places in Stearns County, Minnesota